The Dacian fortress of Marca was a Dacian fortified town.

References

Dacian fortresses in Sălaj County
History of Crișana